Strongheart is a 1914 American silent Western black and white film directed by James Kirkwood Sr., produced by Henry B. Harris, written by Frank E. Woods and starring Henry B. Walthall, Lionel Barrymore, Blanche Sweet and Antonio Moreno. The film was supervised by D.W. Griffith.

It is based on the four-act play by William C. deMille, and it was produced by Henry B. Harris at the Hudson Theater on 30 January 1905 for 66 performances with Robert Edeson.

The melodrama Braveheart is a remake of Strongheart.

Cast
 Antonio Moreno as Frank Nelson
 Blanche Sweet as Dorothy Nelson, Frank's Sister
 Henry B. Walthall as Soangataha / Strongheart
 Gertrude Robinson as Molly Livingston
 Tom McEvoy as Dick Livingston, Molly's Brother
 Lionel Barrymore as Billy Saunders
 Alan Hale Sr. as Ralph Thorne
 William J. Butler as Manager of the Opposing Team
 W.C. Robinson as Team Assistant
 James Kirkwood
 Jack Mulhall as In Stadium Crowd

References

External links
 

1914 films
1914 Western (genre) films
American black-and-white films
American films based on plays
American silent short films
Biograph Company films
Films based on works by American writers
Films directed by James Kirkwood Sr.
Films with screenplays by Frank E. Woods
General Film Company
Silent American Western (genre) films
1910s American films